Carlos Eduardo Bizzaro (born January 9, 1980), known as just Carlos Eduardo, is a Brazilian former footballer.

External links
 Brazilian FA Database
 Profile at liga-indonesia.co.id

1980 births
Living people
Brazilian footballers
Brazilian expatriate footballers
Association football defenders
Brazilian expatriate sportspeople in Indonesia
Expatriate footballers in Indonesia
Liga 1 (Indonesia) players
Pelita Bandung Raya players
Wuhan Guanggu players